Hari Ram Sardar was an Indian politician and member of the Jharkhand Mukti Morcha. Sardar was a member of the Bihar Legislative Assembly from the Potka constituency in Purbi Singhbhum district in 1990 and 1995.

See also 
 Sanatan Sardar
 Amulya Sardar
 Maneka Sardar

References 

Indian politicians
Bhumij people
Adivasi politicians
People from East Singhbhum district